Amadou Konte (born 13 January 1981 in Bamako) is a Malian-French former footballer.

Career 
Konte started his career in the football academy of French side RC Strasbourg before moving to Portuguese club FC Porto. He did not make a first team breakthrough in FC Porto though, and moved again, firstly to CF Villanovense in Spain, then Olympique Noisy-le-Sec in CFA and Paternò in Serie C1.

In the summer of 2004 Konte signed for Cambridge United and scored 3 goals in 9 appearances. This was enough to prompt interest from Hibernian, who signed him during the January 2005 transfer window, and he made his debut in a 3–0 defeat to Rangers at Ibrox the next month. His first goal was a late equaliser against Motherwell in May, earning Hibs a crucial point in their successful quest to qualify for European competition.

The 2005–06 season was less rewarding for Konte though, as the striker endured inconsistent form and infrequent appearances. This led to him being ironically dubbed the "Mali Magician" by some Hibs fans. When Konte again struggled to gain first team action in the first part of the 2006–07 season (despite scoring twice against Dinaburg FC in the UEFA Intertoto Cup) he was released from his contract. He left Hibernian one day before the appointment of new manager John Collins, in November 2006. In 2020, Konte reflected on his time at Hibs, stating that he enjoys his status as a cult favourite and felt that the nickname bestowed upon him by fans was an affectionate one.

In January 2007, he joined Messiniakos of Greek 2nd division. In summer 2007, he signed for Potenza S.C. of Serie C1, and in January 2008, he was loaned to Spezia.

In September 2009, after a nine-month stint with Turate, he was signed by Sicilian club Messina on a free transfer.

References

External links 
 
 gazzetta.it

1981 births
Living people
Malian footballers
French footballers
Expatriate footballers in Italy
FC Porto players
Cambridge United F.C. players
Hibernian F.C. players
Spezia Calcio players
Kalamata F.C. players
Serie B players
Scottish Premier League players
Expatriate footballers in Scotland
Sportspeople from Bamako
Expatriate footballers in Portugal
A.S.D. Paternò 1908 players
Malian expatriates in the United Kingdom
Olympique Noisy-le-Sec players
Association football forwards
S.C. Caronnese S.S.D. players
French people of Malian descent